Cratering may refer to:
 The formation of craters
 Particularly, impact craters
 A reindeer digging behaviour